is a city located in northeastern Hiroshima Prefecture, Japan. The city was founded on March 31, 1954. As of November 1, 2021, the city has an estimated population of 33,476 and a population density of 26.85 persons per km². The total area is 1,246.60 km².

On March 31, 2005, the towns of Hiwa, Kuchiwa, Saijō, Takano, and Tōjō (all from Hiba District), and the town of Sōryō (from Kōnu District) were merged into Shōbara. Hiba District and Kōnu District were both dissolved as a result of this merger.

Geography

Climate
Shōbara has a humid subtropical climate (Köppen climate classification Cfa) characterized by cool to mild winters and hot, humid summers.

Demographics
Per Japanese census data, the population of Shōbara in 2020 is 33,633 people. Shōbara has been conducting censuses since 1920.

References

External links

Cities in Hiroshima Prefecture
Shōbara, Hiroshima